Gisella Marengo (born 16 December 1975) is an Italian actress and producer. Marengo played the role of Nurse Nicu in the 2005 thriller Mary, and Matilde in the 2009 comedy Baarìa. In 2011 she played the role of Maliva – mother of Rose McGowan's character Marique in the fantasy film Conan the Barbarian. She co-produced The Legend of Hercules, and The Humbling.

Filmography 
 Io amo Andrea, director Francesco Nuti (2000)
 Il cuore altrove, director Pupi Avati (2003)
 Sandra Kristoff, director Vito Vinci (2005)
 Mary, director Abel Ferrara (2005)
 Casa Vianello, TV serial 2 episodes (2006)
 La sconosciuta, director Giuseppe Tornatore (2006)
 Voce del verbo amore, director Andrea Manni (2007)
 La terza madre, director Dario Argento (2007)
 Scusa ma ti chiamo amore, director Federico Moccia (2008)
 Il papà di Giovanna, director Pupi Avati (2008)
 Le cose in te nascoste, director Vito Vinci (2008)
 Gli amici del bar Margherita, director Pupi Avati (2009)
 Baarìa, director Giuseppe Tornatore (2009)
 Doc West, director Giulio Base (2009)
 Doc West: La sfida, director Giulio Base (2009)
 Il figlio più piccolo, director Pupi Avati (2010)
 Conan the Barbarian, director Marcus Nispel (2010)
 The Son of No One, director Dito Montiel (2011)
 Wilde Salomé, director Al Pacino (2011)
 Quello che so sull'amore, director Gabriele Muccino (2012)
 Third Person, director Paul Haggis (2013)

 Productions 
 Hercules - La leggenda ha inizio (2014)
 Leningrad (2014)
 Security (2017)

 Theatre 
 Donne di una certa classe (2003)
 Torquis (2011)
 Women with Class'' (2013)

References

External links

Living people
Italian actresses
1975 births
Italian film producers